The 1990–91 Nebraska Cornhuskers men's basketball team represented the University of Nebraska, Lincoln during the 1990–91 college basketball season. Led by head coach Danny Nee (5th season), the Cornhuskers competed in the Big Eight Conference and played their home games at the Bob Devaney Sports Center. They finished with a record of 26–8 overall and 9–5 in Big Eight Conference play, establishing the single-season school record for wins. Nebraska fell to Missouri, 90–82, in the championship game of the Big Eight tournament, but earned an at-large bid to the 1991 NCAA tournament as the #3 seed in the Midwest region. It would be the first of four consecutive trips to the NCAA Tournament for the Nebraska men's basketball program.

Roster

Schedule and results 

|-
!colspan=12 style=| Regular season

|-
!colspan=12 style=| Big Eight tournament

|-
!colspan=12 style=| NCAA Tournament

Rankings

Team players drafted into the NBA

References

Nebraska
Nebraska Cornhuskers men's basketball seasons
Corn
Corn
Nebraska